Real estate investment clubs are clubs formed by individuals who want to invest specifically in real estate.

Individuals have long known that it is possible to make money by investing in real estate, but very few, proportionately speaking, have the capital available to be able to do any investing. The solution is for individuals to join real estate investment clubs (which need to be distinguished from a formally established real estate investment trust, so that their money can be pooled together in order to purchase properties that they otherwise could not afford to buy.

Real estate investment clubs have been booming since the 1990s, so much so that the National Real Estate Investors Association was formed in the late 1990s. In 2002 they had 44 active affiliated groups, and in 2008 they had over 230 groups.

Real estate investment clubs vary between those that focus on single family homes, and those that focus on commercial real estate.

General Investment Clubs
Other agencies online include the Real Estate Investment Club, Commercial Real Estate Online and the National Real Estate Network. These organizations deal with properties around the country.

Women's Investment Clubs
Many women are able to get involved in real estate investing by joining Investment Clubs - not necessarily ones which only feature female members. NuWire Investor advised this avenue in an article published on January 22, 2008., BellaOnline has also published articles encouraging women to join such groups. Women in Real Estate was formed in 1983 by women working in the California real estate industry. Membership is open to commercial real estate professionals with a minimum of two years experience in the industry.

Minorities and Investment Clubs
Many minority communities are also creating investment clubs. For example, the Milwaukee Journal Sentinel reported a story on October 18, 2005 about Communities Learning to Invest and Mobilize for Business (CLIMB), funded by the Annie E. Casey Foundation and the Forest County Potawatomi Community Foundation, in order to help minority communities accumulate as much as $100,000 in assets within a decade.,

Local Investment Clubs
There are two types of investment clubs - those that focus nationally, such as Commercial Real Estate Online and the National Real Estate Network, and those that focus on the local neighborhood, such as Milwaukee's CLIMB program or The Power To Be Free Commercial Real Estate Club of Michigan.

References

See also
FSBO
Real estate broker
United States housing bubble
Multiple Listing Service (MLS)
Internet Data Exchange (IDX)
List of real estate topics

Real estate investing
Residential real estate
Commercial real estate